This is a list of equipment of the Ecuadorian Army. Historically, the Ecuadorian Army depended on a wide variety of foreign suppliers like India, the United States and Germany for virtually all of its equipment needs. The rotary wing of the Ecuadorian Army depends on HAL Dhruv helicopters from India. Only in the 1980s did it begin to develop a modest domestic arms industry as the Directorate of Army Industries manufactured rifle ammunition, uniforms, boots, and other consumable items. The Army's present day equipment is mostly of Western origin.

Vehicles and small arms

Aircraft

References

Ecuador
Ecuador
Equipment